Brachycythara is a genus of very small predatory sea snails, marine gastropod mollusks in the family Mangeliidae.

Description
(Original description) The shell is small, stout and biconic. The protoconch is small-tipped, consisting of about 3 very rapidly enlarging whorls. The body whorl is sculptured with crowded, protractive, curved, axial riblets. The aperture is long and narrow. The base of the shell is barely emarginate. The anterior canal is not differentiated. The outer lip is not varicose, except at intervals corresponding to axial ribs. The anal notch is shallow. Specimens with a perfectly formed outer lip show a low denticle below the notch well within the aperture. The parietal callus is moderately thickened adjoining notch. The sculpture consists of axial ribs, barely overridden by fine spiral threads, and of microscopic frosted spirals.

Brachycythara is a genus of small, biconic turrids having a very rapidly enlarging axially sculptured protoconch, non-varicose outer lip, and no anterior canal.

Species
Species within the genus Brachycythara include:
 Brachycythara alba (Adams C. B., 1850)
 Brachycythara barbarae Lyons, 1972
 Brachycythara biconica (C. B. Adams, 1850)
 Brachycythara brevis (Adams C. B., 1850)
 † Brachycythara dasa  J. Gardner, 1937 
 Brachycythara galae Fargo, 1953
 † Brachycythara gibba Guppy, R.J.L. in Guppy, R.J.L. & W.H. Dall, 1896
 Brachycythara multicincta Rolan & Espinosa, 1999
 Brachycythara nanodes (Melvill, 1923)
 † Brachycythara reidenbachi  Ward & B.W. Blackwelder, 1987 
 † Brachycythara turrita  W.C. Mansfield, 1930
Species brought into synonymy
 Brachycythara atlantidea (Knudsen, 1952): synonym of Bela atlantidea (Knudsen, 1952)
 Brachycythara beatriceae Mariottini, 2007: synonym of Bela beatriceae (Mariottini, 2007)
 Brachycythara multicinctata Rolán & Espinosa, 1999: synonym of Brachycythara multicincta Rolán & Espinosa, 1999
 Brachycythara stegeri Nowell-Usticke, 1959: synonym of Splendrillia stegeri (Nowell-Usticke, 1959)

References

 Rolán E. & Espinosa J. (1999). El complejo Brachycythara biconica (C. B. Adams, 1850) (Mollusca: Gastropoda: Turridae) en Cuba, con la descripción de una nueva especie. Bollettino Malacologico, 34(1-4): 43-49.

External links
 Todd, Jonathan A. "Systematic list of gastropods in the Panama Paleontology Project collections." Budd and Foster 2006 (1996)
  Tucker, J.K. 2004 Catalog of recent and fossil turrids (Mollusca: Gastropoda). Zootaxa 682:1-1295.
 Worldwide Mollusc Species Data Base: Mangeliidae

 
Gastropod genera